Bäjkån och Bällman was the 1991 edition of Sveriges Radio's Christmas Calendar.

Plot
Indian peafowl bird Bällman grew up among chicken who tried to tease him. Bällman lives at Bäjkån, inventor and artists, as well as former seaman who has been to Germany.

CD and cassette tape
The same year, it was also released to CD and cassette tape by the Silence label.

References
 

1991 radio programme debuts
1991 radio programme endings
Sveriges Radio's Christmas Calendar